The 1924 All-Ireland Senior Hurling Championship was the 38th staging of the All-Ireland Senior Hurling Championship, the Gaelic Athletic Association's premier inter-county hurling tournament. The championship began on 4 May 1924 and ended on 14 December 1924.

The championship was won by Dublin who secured the title following a 5-3 to 2-6 defeat of Galway in the All-Ireland final. This was their fourth All-Ireland title.

Galway entered the championship as the defending champions.

Results

Leinster Senior Hurling Championship

Munster Senior Hurling Championship

Ulster Senior Hurling Championship

All-Ireland Senior Hurling Championship

Sources

 Corry, Eoghan, The GAA Book of Lists (Hodder Headline Ireland, 2005).
 Donegan, Des, The Complete Handbook of Gaelic Games (DBA Publications Limited, 2005).

References

1924
All-Ireland Senior Hurling Championship